The northern giraffe (Giraffa camelopardalis), also known as three-horned giraffe, is the type species of giraffe, G. camelopardalis, and is native to North Africa, although alternative taxonomic hypotheses have proposed the northern giraffe as a separate species.

Once abundant throughout Africa since the 19th century, Northern giraffes ranged from Senegal, Mali and Nigeria from West Africa to up north in Egypt.  The similar West African giraffes lived in Algeria and Morocco in ancient periods until their extinctions due to the Saharan dry climate.

Giraffes collectively are considered Vulnerable to extinction by the International Union for Conservation of Nature (IUCN), with around 97,000 wild individuals alive in 2016,  of which 5,195 are Northern giraffes.

Taxonomy and evolution
The current IUCN taxonomic scheme lists one species of giraffe with the name G. camelopardalis and nine subspecies. A 2021 whole genome sequencing study suggests the northern giraffe as a separate species, and postulates the existence of three distinct subspecies.

Description

Often mistaken with the Southern Giraffes, Northern giraffes can be differentiated by the shape and size of the two distinctive horn-like protuberances known as ossicones on their foreheads; they are longer and larger than those of southern giraffes. Bull Northern giraffes have a third cylindrical ossicone in the center of the head just above the eyes, which is from 3 to 5 inches long.

Distribution and habitat
Northern giraffes live in savannahs, shrublands, and woodlands. After numerous local extinctions, Northern giraffes are the least numerous giraffe species, and the most endangered. In East Africa, they are mostly found in Kenya and southwestern Ethiopia, and rarely in northeastern Democratic Republic of the Congo and South Sudan. In Central Africa, there are about 2,000 in the Central African Republic, Chad and Cameroon. Once widespread in West Africa, a few hundred Northern giraffes are confined in the Dosso Reserve of Kouré, Niger. They are isolated in South Sudan, Kenya, Chad and Niger. They commonly live both in and outside of protected areas.

The earliest ranges of the Northern giraffes were in Chad during the late Pliocene. Once abundant in North Africa, they lived in Algeria from the early Pleistocene during the Quaternary period. They lived in Morocco, Libya and Egypt until their extinction there around AD 600, as the drying climate of the Sahara made conditions impossible for giraffes. Giraffe bones and fossils have been found across these countries.

References

External links

ARKive – images and movies of the giraffe (Giraffa camelopardalis).
 Giraffe, African Wildlife Foundation
 Giraffe

Giraffes
Mammals of North Africa
Mammals described in 1758
Taxa named by Carl Linnaeus
Extant Miocene first appearances